Solveig Anita Jönsson, born 27 October 1947, is a Swedish social democratic politician. She was a member of the Riksdag from 1988 to 2006.

External links
Anita Jönsson at the Riksdag website

1947 births
Living people
Members of the Riksdag from the Social Democrats
Women members of the Riksdag
Members of the Riksdag 2002–2006
21st-century Swedish women politicians